Uithuizen (abbreviation: Uhz) is a railway station located in Uithuizen in the Netherlands. The station was opened on 16 August 1893 and is located on the Sauwerd–Roodeschool railway. The train services are operated by Arriva.

Services

Trains
The following services currently call at Uithuizen:
2x per hour local service (stoptrein) Groningen - Roodeschool

Buses
These services are operated by qbuzz, visit www.qbuzz.nl

 61 - Delfzijl - Appingedam - Holwierde - Spijk -Roodeschool - Uithuizermeeden - Uithuizen - Usquert - Rottum - Middelstum - Bedum - Zuidwolde - Groningen (Hourly)
 62 - Uithuizen - Zandeweer - Eppenhuizen - Garsthuizen - Westeredem - Loppersum (Taxibus)
 662 - Uithuizen - Zandeweer - Eppenhuizen - Garsthuizen - Loppersum (Schoolbus)

References

External links
 Uithuizen station, station information

Transport in Het Hogeland
Railway stations in Groningen (province)
Railway stations opened in 1893